Leroy James Sullivan (born June 27, 1933) is an American firearms inventor.  Going by Jim Sullivan, he has designed several "scaled-down" versions of larger firearms.

Early life
Sullivan was born on June 27, 1933 in Nome, Alaska. Sullivan lived in Nome until he was seven years old, concerned that World War II would spread to Alaska, Sullivan's family moved to Seattle, Washington.

Education
Sullivan attended the public schools of Seattle, and later in Kennewick, Washington. Sullivan went on to study engineering, for two years, at the University of Washington in Seattle. Aware that he was about to be drafted to fight in the Korean War Sullivan wanted to become an Army diver, so he left the University of Washington  to attend the Sparling School of Deep Sea Diving in Long Beach, California.

Military service
Sullivan served in the US Army, from 1953 to 1955, although he was trained by the Army to be a telephone installer and repairman. Due to his civilian training he went overseas to Korea in 1954, where he was assigned by the Army to be a diver to repair oil pipelines and other facilities damaged during the US invasion of Inchon Harbor.

Small arms designer
Sullivan is largely responsible for the Ultimax 100 light machine gun and the SureFire MGX. He also contributed to the Ruger M77 rifle, M16, Stoner 63, and Ruger Mini-14 rifles (scaled from the AR-10, Stoner 62, and M14 rifle respectively).

References

1933 births
Living people
United States Army personnel of the Korean War
Inventors from Alaska
Weapon designers
Weapon design
Firearm designers
People from Nome, Alaska
People from Seattle
People associated with firearms